The Estadio Nicolás Álvarez Ortega is a multi-use stadium in Tepic, Nayarit, Mexico. It is currently used mostly for football matches and is the home stadium of Coras. The stadium has a capacity of 12,271 and opened in 2011.

Sports venues in Nayarit
Arena Cora
Athletics (track and field) venues in Mexico
2011 establishments in Mexico
Sports venues completed in 2011